Tsutomu Irie (born 6 May 1948) is a Japanese professional golfer.

Irie played on the Japan Golf Tour, winning twice. In 1985, he became the first player to break the 60 barrier in major professional tournament in Japan when he scored 59 (11 under par) in the first round of the Kuzuha International; he went on the win the two-round tournament.

Professional wins (3)

Japan Golf Tour wins (2)

Other wins (1)
1985 Kuzuha International

Team appearances
Eisenhower Trophy (representing Japan): 1970, 1972, 1974

References

External links

Japanese male golfers
Japan Golf Tour golfers
Sportspeople from Hyōgo Prefecture
1948 births
Living people